Nikolai Yakovlevich Ilyin (25 June 1922 — 4 August 1943) was one of the top Soviet snipers of World War II. Awarded the title Hero of the Soviet Union on 8 February 1943 for his first 216 kills, by the time he was killed in action later that year his tally reached 494.

References 

1922 births
1943 deaths
Heroes of the Soviet Union
Recipients of the Order of Lenin
Recipients of the Order of the Red Banner
Soviet military snipers
Soviet military personnel killed in World War II